Jorge Alberto Lepra Loiodice (4 September 1942 – 4 January 2016) was a Uruguayan diplomat and politician.

Background
Lepra was born in Montevideo. He pursued a business career, including work for Texaco, prior to entering politics. He was politically independent.

Lepra died from heart failure on 4 January 2016 in Montevideo. He was 73.

Public offices

Ministerial rôle
Lepra served as Uruguayan Minister of Industry from March 2005 until March 2008, in the government of President of Uruguay Tabaré Vázquez. He resigned from that post to take up a diplomatic appointment, and was succeeded by Daniel Martínez.

Ambassador to France
From March 2008 to 2010, Lepra served as Uruguayan Ambassador to France.

See also

Politics of Uruguay

References

1942 births
2016 deaths
Ambassadors of Uruguay to France
Ministers of Industries, Energy and Mining of Uruguay